Kin-iro Mosaic is an anime television series produced by Studio Gokumi, based on the 4-panel manga series written and illustrated by Yui Hara and published in Houbunsha's Manga Time Kirara Max magazine. The story follows Shinobu Omiya and her friends as she is joined by her friend from England, Alice Cartelet. The first season aired in Japan on AT-X between July 6, 2013 and September 21, 2013. The respective opening and ending themes are "Jumping!!" and "Your Voice", both performed by Rhodanthe* (Asuka Nishi, Manami Tanaka, Risa Taneda, Nao Tōyama and Yumi Uchiyama). A second season, Hello!! Kin-iro Mosaic, aired between April 5, 2015 and June 21, 2015. Both series were simulcast by Crunchyroll and are licensed in North America by Sentai Filmworks under the title Kinmoza!. An original video animation episode, titled Kin-iro Mosaic: Pretty Days, aired in Japanese theaters on November 12, 2016 and was released on Blu-ray Disc and DVD on March 3, 2017.

Episode list

Kin-iro Mosaic (2013)

Hello!! Kin-iro Mosaic (2015)

Kin-iro Mosaic: Pretty Days (2017 OVA)

References

Kin-iro Mosaic